Steinheuterode is a small municipality in the district of Eichsfeld in Thuringia, in the center of Germany.

Location
It is located at an altitude of 316 m at the foot of the Steinberg hill, and is surrounded by forest. The houses are arranged around the St. Alban church and a community center.

Coat of arms
In the center of Steinheuterode's coat of arms is a billygoat, which refers to the nickname of the inhabitants: Steintreeder Zeggenböcke. There is a golden oak leaf on the left, representing the location of the municipality in Eichsfeld. The stump in the foreground is symbolic of the establishment of the village as a clearance village. The mountain at the bottom represents the location of Steinheuterode, at the foot of the Steinberg.

History
The first time the village was documented was in 1228, when it was called Hauwerterode. To distinguish it from the Eichsfeldian village Wüstheuterode, the prefix Stein was added. A manor was built in 1575 and in 1732 the fountain Regine was constructed in the courtyard of the manor, which today serves as a community center.

References

External links
Photos of the 775th anniversary pageant in 2003
Eichsfelder schools present their district - Steinheuterode
Steinheuterode's Coat of Arms

Eichsfeld (district)